Briffa is a surname. Notable people with the surname include:

Emmanuel Briffa (1875–1955), Canadian theatre decorator
Jimmy Briffa (born 1948), Maltese professional footballer and manager
Keith Briffa (1952–2017), climatologist in the Climatic Research Unit at the University of East Anglia
Louis Briffa (born 1971), Maltese poet
Roderick Briffa (born 1981), Maltese professional footballer
Rużar Briffa (1906–1963), Maltese poet, dermatologist, major figure in Maltese literature
Tony Briffa (politician) (born 1971 Antoinette Briffa), Australian mayor, intersex activist and educator
Tony Briffa (artist) (born 1959), Maltese artist

See also
Biffa
Braffais
Briffons
Brouffia